Ali Hammoud (born 1944) is a former Syrian intelligence officer and general who served as minister of interior from 2001 to 2004.

Early life
Hammoud was born in Homs into an Alawite family in 1944.

Career
Hammoud served as head of the general security administration and involved in suppressing the Islamic revolt during the period of 1976–1982. He was an intelligence officer served in West Beirut. Then he was made Syria's military intelligence chief in Beirut and had the rank of brigadier general. During his term in Lebanon, he had close ties with Emile Lahoud. In May 1988 while serving as military intelligence chief in Lebanon Hammoud and three other Syrian military officers, Saeed Bairaqdar, Ghazi Kanaan and Zuheir Mustat, escaped an assassination in Ghobeiry district of Beirut.

Hammoud was named the head of the General Security Directorate in October 2001, replacing Ali Houri in the post. Shortly after he was appointed interior minister in December 2001 in a cabinet reshuffle by Bashar al-Assad and replaced Mohammad Harba as interior minister. Hammoud was also promoted to the rank of major general. the cabinet was headed by Prime Minister Muhammad Mustafa Mero. Hisham Ikhtiar succeeded Hammoud as the head of the General Security Directorate. Hammoud served as interior minister until October 2004 when he was replaced by Ghazi Kanaan in a cabinet reshuffle.

References

External links

1944 births
Arab Socialist Ba'ath Party – Syria Region politicians
Living people
People from Homs
Syrian Alawites
Syrian generals
Syrian ministers of interior
Survivors of terrorist attacks